William E. Pearson (born 1979) is the co-founder of mental floss, a bi-monthly magazine, which he started with Mangesh Hattikudur, where both of them were students at Duke University. Pearson graduated from Duke in 2001, with a Bachelor of Arts degree in history. Will Pearson and Mangesh Hattikudur met as freshmen at Duke University and in their senior year parlayed their cafeteria conversations into the first issue of mental_floss magazine. In addition to the magazine, a board game, a weekly CNN Headline News segment and a daily updated website, the two have collaborated on seven mental_floss books. Pearson and Hattikidur were named two of thirty promising 2007 entrepreneurs in business magazine Inc.

References

1983 births
Duke University Trinity College of Arts and Sciences alumni
American magazine editors
Living people
Date of birth missing (living people)